The House Recording Studio provides radio and television recording services to Members, Committees, and Officers of the United States House of Representatives.  The purpose of the Recording Studio is to provide a convenient way for Members to convey information to their constituents, the media, and the general public.

The services provided include basic recording services, live or recorded satellite transmissions, telephone recordings, preparation of teleprompter scripts, transcription of recorded material, post-production services, and television makeup. Recording Studio staff also provide program production and technical assistance. Each time a Member uses the Recording Studio, the Member’s official account is charged for the services provided.

Recording Studio
Recording studios in the United States